Imposex is a disorder in sea snails caused by the toxic effects of certain marine pollutants. These pollutants cause female sea snails (marine gastropod molluscs) to develop male sex organs such as a penis and a vas deferens.

Imposex inducing substances

It was believed that the only inducer of imposex was tributyltin (TBT), which can be active in extremely low concentrations, but recent studies reported other substances as inducers, such as triphenyltin and ethanol. Tributyltin is used as an anti-fouling agent for boats which affects females of the species Nucella lapillus (dog whelk), Voluta ebraea (the Hebrew volute), Olivancillaria vesica, Stramonita haemastoma (red-mouthed rock shell) and more than 200 other marine gastropods.

Abnormalities
In the dog whelk, the growth of a penis in imposex females gradually blocks the oviduct, although ovule production continues. An imposex female dog whelk passes through several stages of penis growth before it becomes unable to maintain a constant production of ovules. Later stages of imposex lead to sterility and the premature death of the females of reproductive age, which can adversely affect the entire population.

In 1993, Scientists from the Plymouth Marine Laboratory found a thriving dog-whelk population in the
Dumpton Gap, near Ramsgate in the UK despite high levels of TBT in the water. In the Dumpton Gap population, only 25% of females showed any significant signs of imposex, while 10% of males were characterized by the absence of a penis or an undersized penis, with incomplete development of the vas deferens and prostate. After further experiments, scientists concluded that "Dumpton Syndrome" was a genetic selection caused by high TBT levels. TBT-resistance was improved at the cost of lower reproductive fitness.

Biomonitoring

The imposex stages of female dog whelks and other molluscs (including Nucella lima) are used in the United Kingdom and worldwide to monitor levels of tributyltin. The RPSI (Relative Penis Size Index) of females to males, and the VDSI (Vas Deferens Sequence Index) are used to monitor levels of tributyltin in marine environments.

A ban on tributyltin was implemented in Canada in 2003, however, in 2006, dog whelks with imposex could still be found on the shores of Halifax Harbour in Nova Scotia.

See also
 Environmental issues with paint

References

 Gibbs, P.E., Bryan, G.W. (1986). Reproductive failure in populations of the dog-whelk Nucella lapillus, caused by imposex induced by tributyltin from antifouling paints. J. Mar. Biol. Assoc. U. K. 66: 767–777.
 "Occurrence of Imposex." Natural Resource Management. 2006.
 Wirzinger, G., Vogt, C., Bachmann, J., Hasenbank, M., Liers, C., Stark, C., Ziebard, S. & Oehlmann, J. (2007). Imposex of the netted whelk Nassarius reticulatus (Prosobranchia) in Brittany along a transect from a point source. Cah. Biol. Mar. 48(1): 85–94.

External links 
 Tributyltin (TBT) antifoulants: a tale of ships, snails and imposex.

Gastropods
Animal diseases
Marine biology
Intersex and medicine